The 2002 United Kingdom Budget, officially known as The strength to make long-term decisions:Investing in an enterprising, fairer Britain was the formal government budget for the year 2002.

The most significant policy implemented as part of this Budget was the 1% National Insurance increase on both employees and employers, the proceeds of which went towards an increase in NHS spending.

Details

Tax Revenue

Spending

References 

Budget
United Kingdom budgets
United Kingdom budget
Gordon Brown